Dargalim was one of the 40 Goa Legislative Assembly constituencies of the state of Goa in southern India. Dargalim was also one of the 20 constituencies falling under the North Goa Lok Sabha constituency.

Members of Legislative Assembly 
 1989: Deu Mandrekar, Maharashtrawadi Gomantak Party
 1994: Deu Mandrekar, Maharashtrawadi Gomantak Party
 1999: Manohar Ajgaonkar, Indian National Congress
 2002: Manohar Ajgaonkar, Bharatiya Janata Party
 2007: Manohar Ajgaonkar, Indian National Congress

Election results

2007

See also
Pernem (Goa Assembly constituency)

References

Former assembly constituencies of Goa
North Goa district